Nacula is a hilly and volcanic island of the Yasawa Group in Fiji's Ba Province. It is the third-largest and is the second-farthest north in the group of islands.

There are 4 resorts on the island called Blue Lagoon Beach Resort, Safe Landing, Oarsman Bay Lodge and Nabua Lodge. Tourism is the main source of income on the island.

Nacula Island has 4 native villages, in descending order of size; Nacula village, Malakati village, Naisisili village and Navotua village.

The island's beaches have turquoise blue, gin-clear lagoons and are popular snorkeling and diving sites.

Gallery

References

External links
Fiji Government Online Portal

Ba Province
Islands of Fiji
Yasawa Islands